Luke M. Powers Catholic High School is a coeducational private Roman Catholic high school located in Flint, Michigan serving students in grades 9–12 under the Roman Catholic Diocese of Lansing.

History

Powers Catholic was established in 1970 under the Roman Catholic Diocese of Lansing and bears of name of Luke M. Powers, a Villanova University educated pastor in Flint from 1929 to 1966.

After 40 years at its original location just north of Flint in Mount Morris Township, Powers relocated to downtown Flint for the 2013-14 school year, with historic Fay Hall serving as the main academic building. As part of a 36 million dollar development approved in 2010, Fay Hall was restored and a 75,000-square-foot addition containing a gymnasium, chapel, library, theater and media center was added to the campus.

In 2022, Powers Catholic alumni Brian Sheeran was named the school’s new principal following the departure of his predecessor, Deacon Sean Costello. Dcn. Costello served in that role for the duration of the 2021-22 school year before accepting a position as Superintendent of Schools for the Archdiocese of Detroit.

Athletics
The Powers Catholic Chargers compete in the Saginaw Valley League. In 2015, the soccer, lacrosse and football teams began playing home games at Kettering University’s historic Atwood Stadium, following a $2 million restoration to the 11,000-seat stadium. The following Michigan High School Athletic Association (MHSAA) sanctioned sports are offered:

Baseball (boys)
State champion - 1974, 1980
Basketball (girls and boys) 
Boys state champion - 2009
Girls state champion - 1991, 1996, 2000, 2001
Bowling (girls and boys) 
Competitive cheerleading (girls) 
Cross country (girls and boys) 
Boys state champion - 1999
Football (boys) 
State champion - 2005, 2011
Golf (girls and boys) 
Boys state champion - 1993, 1995, 1998, 2001, 2006, 2018
Girls state champion  - 1989, 1993, 1994, 2007, 2008, 2018
Ice hockey (boys) 2023 divison 3 state champion 
Lacrosse (girls and boys) 
Girls state champion - 2008
Skiing (girls and boys) 
Soccer (girls and boys) 
Boys state champion - 1996, 2013, 2017
Girls state champion - 2011, 2017. 2018
Softball (girls) 
Swim and dive (girls and boys) 
Tennis (girls and boys) 
Track and field (girls and boys) 
Volleyball (girls)
Wrestling (boys)

References

External links
 School website

Roman Catholic Diocese of Lansing
Catholic secondary schools in Michigan
Educational institutions established in 1970
High schools in Flint, Michigan
1970 establishments in Michigan